The HTC Raider 4G (codenamed HTC Holiday, also known as the HTC Vivid and HTC Velocity 4G) is a smartphone which was released on September 21, 2011, in South Korea. The phone is manufactured by HTC Corporation and runs Android 2.3 with included HTC Sense 3.0. It has since been upgradable to Android 4.0.3 with HTC Sense 3.6 in certain markets.

On October 27, 2011, the phone was announced in Canada, with an underclocked 1.2 GHz dual-core processor for Rogers Wireless and Bell Mobility.

The phone was released in the United States as the HTC Vivid on November 6, 2011, by AT&T as their first LTE-enabled device. It also shipped with the 1.2 GHz underclocked processor as the Canadian variants.

As the HTC Velocity 4G, the phone was released in Australia by Telstra on January 24, 2012, as their first LTE-enabled device. It was announced in Hong Kong on February 1, 2012, by Hong Kong CSL as their first LTE-enabled device which only supports the 2600 MHz LTE band. Vodafone Germany announced it on February 8, 2012, as their first LTE-enabled device.

As of February 11, 2013, the HTC Vivid is still available online at AT&T for $.01 with a new or existing contract and a Required data plan.

See also
 List of Android devices

References

External links
Shopping Prices

Mobile phones introduced in 2011
Discontinued smartphones
Android (operating system) devices
HTC smartphones